Immortal is the sixth solo Studio Album by Bob Catley, released by Frontiers Records in 2008.

Track listing
All songs by Magnus Karlsson

 "Dreamers Unite" - 6:19
 "We Are Immortal" - 5:44 
 "End of the World" - 5:03
 "Open Your Eyes" - 4:25
 "The Searcher" - 5:13
 "One More Night" - 4:43
 "Light Up My Way" - 5:42
 "You Are My Star" - 4:56
 "War in Heaven" - 4:56
 "Win the Throne" - 4:21
 "Haunted" - 4:45
 "Heat of Passion" - 5:34

Personnel
Bob Catley - vocals
Dennis Ward - all guitars (except solos on tracks 3, 4, 5, 6, and 9), bass guitar and additional keyboards 
Uwe Reitenauer - additional guitars on tracks 1, 5, 8, 9, guitar solos on tracks 4, 5, 6, 9 
Magnus Karlsson - keyboards, guitar solo on track 3
Dirk Bruinenberg - drums

Production
Produced, recorded, mixed and mastered by Dennis Ward
Executive producer Serafino Perugino

References

External links
Official Bob Catley site

Bob Catley albums
2008 albums
Frontiers Records albums
Albums produced by Dennis Ward (musician)
Albums with cover art by Rodney Matthews